Karschiidae is a family of solifuges, first described by Karl Kraepelin in 1899.

Genera 
, the World Solifugae Catalog accepts the following four genera:

 Barrus Simon, 1880
 Barrussus Roewer, 1928
 Eusimonia Kraepelin, 1899
 Karschia Walter, 1889

References 

Solifugae
Arachnid families